Krasen may refer to:

Places
Krasen, Dobrich Province, a village in Dobrich Province, Bulgaria

People
Krasen Kralev, a Bulgarian businessman and politician
Krasen Trifonov, a Bulgarian football player

Other uses
Krasen (fortress), a Bulgarian fortress from the 10th century AD
Kråsen Crevasse Field, a crevasse field in Queen Maud Land, Antarctica.